Turning Points of History is a Canadian television series produced by History Television since 1997. Each episode focuses on a significant point in history.  The series was narrated by Cedric Smith. Among the various historical topics covered are Juno Beach, polio, and bush pilots.

External links
 Turning Points of History at IMDb.

1990s Canadian documentary television series
Historical television series
History (Canadian TV network) original programming
Television series by Alliance Atlantis
Television series by Entertainment One